1964 saw Club Atlético Independiente become the first Argentine team to win the Copa Libertadores. Boca Juniors were the champions of the Argentine first division.

Primera División

Relegation 
 There was no relegation due to the expansion of the Primera División from 16 to 18 teams.

Copa Libertadores 

 Boca Juniors qualified for Copa Libertadores 1965 via the league, Independiente qualified as the Libertadores champions of 1964.

Copa Libertadores 1964 
 Independiente: Champions

References 

 Argentina 1964 by Pablo Ciullini at rsssf.
 Copa Libertadores 1964 by José Luis Pierrend, John Beuker and Osvaldo José Gorgazzi at rsssf.

 
Argentine